The 2007 European Tour was the 36th golf season since the European Tour officially began in 1972. 

The season began with six tournaments in late 2006 and consisted of record 52 official money events, surpassing the 2005 and 2006 seasons. This included the four major championships and three World Golf Championships, which were also sanctioned by the PGA Tour. 29 events took place in Europe, 12 in Asia, six in the United States, three in South Africa, one in Australia and one in New Zealand. The PGA Tour's introduction of the FedEx Cup prompted the European Tour to extend the season into November and several tournaments moved away from their traditional dates.

The Order of Merit race came down to the closing holes of the final tournament, and was won by Justin Rose for the first time despite the Englishman playing the majority of his golf in America. Rose overtook Ernie Els and held off the challenge of the defending Order of Merit champion Pádraig Harrington. The Player of the Year award was given to Harrington after his victories at The Open Championship and the Irish Open. The Sir Henry Cotton Rookie of the Year was Martin Kaymer of Germany.

Major tournaments

For a summary of the major tournaments and events of 2007, including the major championships and the World Golf Championships, see 2007 in golf.

Changes for 2007
There were three new tournaments, the Joburg Open in South Africa, the Open de Andalucía in Spain and the Portugal Masters. In addition, the long-established Australian Masters joined the tour schedule and two tournaments returned after missing the 2006 season; the New Zealand Open skipped a season due to date changes, and the German Masters having not been held in 2006, came back with a new sponsor and was re-titled as the Mercedes-Benz Championship.

Schedule
The following table lists official events during the 2007 season.

Unofficial events
The following events were sanctioned by the European Tour, but did not carry official money, nor were wins official.

Order of Merit
The Order of Merit was based on prize money won during the season, calculated in Euros.

Awards

See also
2007 in golf
2007 Challenge Tour
2007 European Seniors Tour
2007 PGA Tour
List of golfers with most European Tour wins

Notes

References

External links
2007 season results on the PGA European Tour website
2007 Order of Merit on the PGA European Tour website

European Tour seasons
European Tour